Oh! My Ghost is a 2022 South Korean comedy horror film, directed by Hong Tae-sun and starring Jeong Jin-woon, Ahn Seo-hyun, Lee Joo-yeon and Jeon Soo-jin. The film written by Yoo Se-moon tells the story of 'Taemin', a ten-year-old trainee who sees ghosts. He gets a job at a shooting studio where every night a mysterious incident occurs. It was anticipated to be released in theatres in the second half of 2021, but was postponed and finally released on September 15, 2022.

Cast
 Jeong Jin-woon as Taemin
 Ahn Seo-hyun as Kongi
 Lee Joo-yeon as Se-ah, a new representative of a shooting studio 
 Jeon Soo-jin as Seung Hee 
 Jung Tae-woo as Myeong-seok, a home shopping video director
 Kang Sung-pil

Production
Oh! My Ghost is a first commercial film, co-produced by Korea University of Media and Film and Film A Pictures Co., Ltd. Principal photography began on February 5, 2021, and was wrapped up at the end of March.

Release
The film was pre-sold in 13 countries overseas even before its release in South Korea. It was released theatrically in South Korea on September 15, 2022.

References

External links
 
 
 

2020s Korean-language films
South Korean comedy horror films
South Korean ghost films
2022 comedy horror films